Martin Sather (born August 23, 1983, in Fairbanks, Alaska) is an American curler.

In 2002 Sather won the United States Junior Curling Championship, playing second for skip Leo Johnson. The national title earned them the opportunity to represent the United States at the 2002 World Junior Championship in Kelowna, British Columbia, where they finished ninth out of ten teams.

After juniors he took a break but returned to competitive curling in 2010. He won the 2012 United States Men's Championship playing second for Heath McCormick, they then finished 8th at the 2012 World Championship.

Teams

Private life
Martin Sather graduated from Western Connecticut State University in 2006.

Out of curling he is a musician and insurance broker.

He started curling in 1992 at the age of 9.

References

External links

Living people
1983 births
Sportspeople from Fairbanks, Alaska
American male curlers
American curling champions
Continental Cup of Curling participants
American jazz musicians
Western Connecticut State University alumni